Scavengers are animals that consume dead organisms that have died from causes other than predation or have been killed by other predators. While scavenging generally refers to carnivores feeding on carrion, it is also a herbivorous feeding behavior. Scavengers play an important role in the ecosystem by consuming dead animal and plant material. Decomposers and detritivores complete this process, by consuming the remains left by scavengers.

Scavengers aid in overcoming fluctuations of food resources in the environment. The process and rate of scavenging is affected by both biotic and abiotic factors, such as carcass size, habitat, temperature, and seasons.

Etymology 
Scavenger is an alteration of scavager, from Middle English skawager meaning "customs collector", from skawage meaning "customs", from Old North French escauwage meaning "inspection", from schauwer meaning "to inspect", of Germanic origin; akin to Old English scēawian and German schauen meaning "to look at", and modern English "show" (with semantic drift).

Types of scavengers (animals) 

Obligate scavenging (subsisting entirely or mainly on dead animals) is rare among vertebrates, due to the difficulty of finding enough carrion without expending too much energy.

Well-known invertebrate scavengers of animal material include burying beetles and blowflies, which are obligate scavengers, and yellowjackets. Fly larvae are also common scavengers for organic materials at the bottom of freshwater bodies. For example, Tokunagayusurika akamusi is a species of midge fly whose larvae live as obligate scavengers at the bottom of lakes and whose adults almost never feed and only live up to a few weeks.

Most scavenging animals are facultative scavengers that gain most of their food through other methods, especially predation. Many large carnivores that hunt regularly, such as hyenas and jackals, but also animals rarely thought of as scavengers, such as African lions, leopards, and wolves will scavenge if given the chance. They may also use their size and ferocity to intimidate the original hunters (the cheetah is a notable victim, rather than a perpetrator). Almost all scavengers above insect size are predators and will hunt if not enough carrion is available, as few ecosystems provide enough dead animals year-round to keep its scavengers fed on that alone. Scavenging wild dogs and crows frequently exploit roadkill.

Scavengers of dead plant material include termites that build nests in grasslands and then collect dead plant material for consumption within the nest. The interaction between scavenging animals and humans is seen today most commonly in suburban settings with animals such as opossums, polecats and raccoons. In some African towns and villages, scavenging from hyenas is also common.

In the prehistoric eras, the species Tyrannosaurus rex may have been an apex predator, preying upon hadrosaurs, ceratopsians, and possibly juvenile sauropods, although some experts have suggested the dinosaur was primarily a scavenger. The debate about whether Tyrannosaurus was an apex predator or scavenger was among the longest ongoing feuds in paleontology; however, most scientists now agree that Tyrannosaurus was an opportunistic carnivore, acting mostly as a predator but also scavenging when it could sense it. Recent research also shows that while an adult Tyrannosaurus rex would energetically gain little through scavenging, smaller theropods of approximately  might have gained levels similar to those of hyenas, though not enough for them to rely on scavenging. 

Other research suggests that carcasses of giant sauropods may have made scavenging much more profitable to carnivores than it is now. For example, a single 40 tonne Apatosaurus carcass would have been worth roughly 6 years of calories for an average allosaur. As a result of this resource oversupply, it is possible that some theropods evolved to get most of their calories by scavenging giant sauropod carcasses, and may not have needed to consistently hunt in order to survive. The same study suggested that theropods in relatively sauropod-free environments, such as tyrannosaurs, were not exposed to the same type of carrion oversupply, and were therefore forced to hunt in order to survive. There are also an info that Megalodon, Ceratosaurus, Andrewsarchus and some more prehistoric animals were scavengers.

Animals which consume feces, such as dung beetles, are referred to as coprovores. Animals that collect small particles of dead organic material of both animal and plant origin are referred to as detritivores.

Ecological function 
Scavengers play a fundamental role in the environment through the removal of decaying organisms, serving as a natural sanitation service. While microscopic and invertebrate decomposers break down dead organisms into simple organic matter which are used by nearby autotrophs, scavengers help conserve energy and nutrients obtained from carrion within the upper trophic levels, and are able to disperse the energy and nutrients farther away from the site of the carrion than decomposers.

Scavenging unites animals which normally would not come into contact, and results in the formation of highly structured and complex communities which engage in nonrandom interactions. Scavenging communities function in the redistribution of energy obtained from carcasses and reducing diseases associated with decomposition. Oftentimes, scavenger communities differ in consistency due to carcass size and carcass types, as well as by seasonal effects as consequence of differing invertebrate and microbial activity.

Competition for carrion results in the inclusion or exclusion of certain scavengers from access to carrion, shaping the scavenger community. When carrion decomposes at a slower rate during cooler seasons, competitions between scavengers decrease, while the number of scavenger species present increases.

Alterations in scavenging communities may result in drastic changes to the scavenging community in general, reduce ecosystem services and have detrimental effects on animal and humans. The reintroduction of gray wolves (Canis lupus) into Yellowstone National Park in the United States caused drastic changes to the prevalent scavenging community, resulting in the provision of carrion to many mammalian and avian species. Likewise, the reduction of vulture species in India lead to the increase of opportunistic species such as feral dogs and rats. The presence of both species at carcasses resulted in the increase of diseases such as rabies and bubonic plague in wildlife and livestock, as feral dogs and rats are transmitters of such diseases. Furthermore, the decline of vulture populations in India has been linked to the increased rates of anthrax in humans due to the handling and ingestion of infected livestock carcasses. An increase of disease transmission has been observed in mammalian scavengers in Kenya due to the decrease in vulture populations in the area, as the decrease in vulture populations resulted in an increase of the number of mammalian scavengers at a given carcass along with the time spent at a carcass.

Disease transmission 
Scavenging may provide a direct and indirect method for transmitting disease between animals. Scavengers of infected carcasses may become hosts for certain pathogens and consequently vectors of disease themselves. An example of this phenomenon is the increased transmission of tuberculosis observed when scavengers engage in eating infected carcasses. Likewise, the ingestion of bat carcasses infected with rabies by striped skunks (Mephitis mephitis) resulted in increased infection of these organisms with the virus.

A major vector of transmission of diseases are various bird species, with outbreak being influenced by such carrier birds and their environment. An avian cholera outbreak from 2006 to 2007 off the coast Newfoundland, Canada resulted in the mortality of many marine bird species. The transmission, perpetuation and spread of the outbreak was mainly restricted to gull species who scavenge for food in the area. Similarly, an increase of transmission of avian influenza virus to chickens by domestic ducks from Indonesian farms permitted to scavenge surrounding areas was observed in 2007. The scavenging of ducks in rice paddy fields in particular resulted in increased contact with other bird species feeding on leftover rice, which may have contributed to increased infection and transmission of the avian influenza virus. The domestic ducks may not have demonstrated symptoms of infection themselves, though were observed to excrete high concentrations of the avian influenza virus.

Threats 

Many species that scavenge face persecution globally. Vultures, in particular, have faced incredible persecution and threats by humans. Before its ban by regional governments in 2006, the veterinary drug Diclofenac has resulted in at least a 95% decline of Gyps vultures in Asia. Habitat loss and food shortage have contributed to the decline of vulture species in West Africa due to the growing human population and over-hunting of vulture food sources, as well as changes in livestock husbandry. Poisoning certain predators to increase the number of game animals is still a common hunting practice in Europe and contributes to the poisoning of vultures when they consume the carcasses of poisoned predators.

Benefits to human well-being 
Highly efficient scavengers, also known as dominant or apex-scavengers, can have benefits to human well being. Increases in dominant scavenger populations, such as vultures, can reduce populations of smaller opportunistic scavengers, such as rats. These smaller scavengers are often pests and disease vectors.

In humans 

In the 1980s, Lewis Binford suggested that early humans primarily obtained meat via scavenging, not through hunting. In 2010, Dennis Bramble and Daniel Lieberman proposed that early carnivorous human ancestors subsequently developed long-distance running behaviors which improved the ability to scavenge and hunt: they could reach scavenging sites more quickly and also pursue a single animal until it could be safely killed at close range due to exhaustion and hyperthermia.

In Tibetan Buddhism the practice of excarnation – that is, the exposure of dead human bodies to carrion birds and/or other scavenging animals – is the distinctive characteristic of sky burial, which involves the dismemberment of human cadavers of whom the remains are fed to vultures, and traditionally the main funeral rite (alongside cremation) used to dispose of the human body. A similar funerary practice that features excarnation can be found in Zoroastrianism; in order to prevent the pollution of the sacred elements (fire, earth, and water) from contact with decomposing bodies, human cadavers are exposed on the Towers of Silence to be eaten by vultures and wild dogs.

Studies in behavioral ecology and ecological epidemiology have shown that cannibalistic necrophagy, although rare, has been observed as a survival behavior in several social species, including anatomically modern humans; however, episodes of human cannibalism occur rarely in most human societies. Many instances have occurred in human history, especially in times of war and famine, where necrophagy and human cannibalism emerged as a survival behavior, although anthropologists report the usage of ritual cannibalism among funerary practices and as the preferred means of disposal of the dead in some tribal societies.

Gallery

See also 
 Consumer-resource systems

Notes

References

Further reading

External links 
 Stitching a Life From the Scraps of Others – slideshow by The New York Times

Ecology